are creatures from Japanese mythology, resembling large mollusks. They are a type of obake, forming when turban snails, especially Turbo cornutus, reach 30 years of age.

Mythology
The most popular legend of the Sazae-oni is that of a group of pirates which rescued a drowning woman from the sea and took her back to the ship. They vied for her attention, but soon found that she was willing to have sex with all of them, then cut their testicles off afterwards. The men, obviously upset, threw her into the ocean, where she revealed her true form, and bartered with the captain for their testicles back. The Sazae-oni ended up leaving with a large amount of pirate gold. Testicles are sometimes called kin-tama or "golden balls" in Japanese, so the punchline goes that gold was bought with gold. Other legends of these creatures depict them wandering into coastal or seaside inns whilst in human guise, whereupon they devour the innkeeper in the night and then escape before morning.

See also
List of legendary creatures in Japanese mythology
Obake

References

External links 
Sazae Oni - The Turban Shell Demon at hyakumonogatari.com (English).

Yōkai
Legendary invertebrates
Female legendary creatures